West Point (sometimes shown as Westpoint) is an unincorporated community and census-designated place in Wayne Township, Tippecanoe County, in the U.S. state of Indiana. The population was 594 at the 2010 census.

The community is part of the Lafayette, Indiana Metropolitan Statistical Area.

History 

The town was platted in 1833 by Samuel Kiser. It was founded as Middleton, but residents changed the name of the town to West Point.

The West Point post office has been in operation since 1836.

Geography 

West Point is located at  (40.345036, -87.043066) along State Road 25 at an elevation of approximately 673 feet.  The town is in Wayne Township and sits about a quarter of a mile north of Flint Creek which flows west to the Wabash River.

A village named Glen Hall existed on the north side of West Point in the 19th century; though still populated, the site is now generally considered part of West Point. Additionally, residents of the former town of Granville are listed using West Point addresses.

Demographics

Economy 

Most residents of West Point are employed outside of the main portion of the town with agriculture and businesses in Lafayette and West Lafayette. There are a number of equestrian centers and horse barns with close ties to the town. West Point is well known in the Lafayette area for its only restaurant, Eddie Joe's Ice House, a tex-mex BBQ joint which replaced the former West Point Steakhouse. Martin's Body and Paint is an automotive repair shop located in the town. Cheesman Inc is a construction and contracting located centrally within West Point.

Religion 

West Point is home to one church, West Point United Methodist. Another church was closed and converted to an antiques shop in the early 2010s.

There are several cemeteries and gravesites within the area. West Point Cemetery is the only one mainly located in the town.

Community 

West Point has a growing level of community involvement, which primarily revolves around West Point Park (the former location of West Point High School, now demolished) and the West Point Volunteer Fire Department. Each year, the Volunteer Fire Department puts on a community fish fry to raise funds for equipment. Halloween is a special time and the entire community is involved in Light Up The Night, a designated night for costumes, food, and candy.

Education 

West Point residents are served by Tippecanoe School Corporation. West Point High School, home of the West Point Cadets, was consolidated into Southwestern HS in 1956, along with Shadeland, Romney, Wea & Jackson. In 1972, Southwester was consolidated into McCutcheon High School. Elementary and middle school students report to Mintonye Elementary School and Southwestern Middle School respectively.

References

Unincorporated communities in Tippecanoe County, Indiana
Unincorporated communities in Indiana
Census-designated places in Tippecanoe County, Indiana
Census-designated places in Indiana
Lafayette metropolitan area, Indiana